{{DISPLAYTITLE:C8H6O}}
The molecular formula C8H6O (molar mass: 118.13 g/mol, exact mass: 118.0419 u) may refer to:

 Benzofuran
 Isobenzofuran, or 2-Benzofuran

Molecular formulas